The 1903–04 Kentucky State men's basketball team competed on behalf of the University of Kentucky during the 1903–04 season. During the season, Kentucky would continue to struggle under the leadership of senior Claire Saint John. The Wildcats would only win one game against the Cincinnati Bearcats men's basketball and lose all four games to Kentucky University and Georgetown College.

Roster

Schedule

|-
!colspan=12 style="background:#273BE2; color:white;"| Regular Season

References

Kentucky
Kentucky Wildcats men's basketball seasons
1903 in sports in Kentucky
1904 in sports in Kentucky